Wiberg is a surname. Notable persons with the name include:

 Anders Wiberg (1816–1887) – Swedish Baptist pioneer
 Curt Wiberg (1898–1988) – sprinter
 Daryl Wiberg (born 1951) – politician
 Finn Wiberg (born 1943) – football player and manager
 Johanna Wiberg (born 1983) – handball player
 Kenneth B. Wiberg (born 1927) – chemist
 Martin Wiberg (1826–1905) – inventor
 Nicklas Wiberg (born 1985) – decathlete
 Per Wiberg (born 1968) – musician
 Pernilla Wiberg (born 1970) – alpine ski racer
 Susanne Wiberg (born 1963) – canoeist

See also
 27267 Wiberg, a planetoid